

Dutch Republic 
 Dutch Ceylon - 
Joan Paul Schaghen, Acting Governor (1725-1726)
Petrus Vuyst, Acting Governor (1726-1729)

Great Britain 
 Province of Pennsylvania - Hannah Callowhill Penn, acting governor

Oman
 Mombasa – Nasr ibn Abdallah al-Mazru‘i, Wali of Mombasa (1698–1728)

Portugal
 Angola – 
 José Carvalho da Costa, Governor of Angola (1725–1726)
 Paulo Caetano de Albuquerque, Governor of Angola (1726–1732)
 Macau – Antonio Carneiro de Alcacova, Governor of Macau (1724–1727)

Colonial governors
Colonial governors
1726